Dance with Me is a 2002 studio album by Friends. The album released was originally postponed from May to later during the year.

The song "In the Heat of the Night" charted at Svensktoppen in February 2003.

Track listing

Charts

References

2002 albums
Friends (Swedish band) albums